Grenada is an island formed by volcanic activity approximately 1-2 million years ago. It is said that the island is completely made of dozens of volcanoes through volcanic activity over a period of time throughout Grenada's formation in history. Ever since then, most of these volcanoes are now extinct except for two underwater submarine volcanoes Kick 'em Jenny and Kick 'em Jack (a smaller less known underwater submarine volcano.) As of today, most of these extinct volcanoes have now become volcano crater lakes and mountains such as Grand Etang Lake or Lake Antoine, Grenada and Mount Saint Catherine (Grenada) Mount Saint Catherine.

This is a list of active and extinct volcanoes in Grenada.

References
Global Volcanism Program: Volcanoes of the West Indies

Grenada
 
Volcanoes